Hugh Walker may refer to:

 Hugh Walker (academic) (1855–1939), British university educator
 Hugh Walker (field hockey) (1888–1958), Scottish Olympic field hockey player